The 2007 W-League Season was the league's 13th.

The Washington Freedom finished the season as national champions, beating the Atlanta Silverbacks Women 3-1 in the W-League Championship game in Rochester, New York on 7 August 2007.

Ottawa Fury Women finished with the best regular season record in the league, winning 11 out of their 12 games, suffering no losses, and finishing with a +38 goal difference.

Changes from 2006 season

Name changes
Two teams changed their names:  
The Long Island Lady Riders changed their name to the Long Island Rough Riders, and the San Diego Lady Gauchos changed their name to the San Diego Sunwaves.

New teams
Three teams were added for the season:

Teams Leaving
Five teams folded after the 2006 season: 
 Central Florida Krush
 Cincinnati Ladyhawks
 New Hampshire Lady Phantoms
 South Jersey Banshees
 Sudbury Canadians

Carolina Dynamo Women went on hiatus for this season.

Standings
Blue indicates division title clinched
Green indicates playoff berth clinched
Orange indicates bye into the W-League semifinals as hosts.

Central Conference

Atlantic Division

Midwest Division

Eastern Conference

Northeast Division

Northern Division

Western Conference

Playoffs

Format
Four teams qualify from the Central Conference, six from the Eastern Conference, and two from the Western Conference.

The Division Winners in the Central Conference will play the second place team of the other division.  In the Eastern Conference, the second and third place team in each division will play, with the winner of that match playing the top team in the other division. Finally, the two winners of the latter matches will play for the Eastern Conference championship. The top two teams in the Western Conference will play each other.

The Rochester Raging Rhinos automatically qualify for the W-League Semifinals as hosts.  They will play the highest-ranked Conference Champion in their semifinal, with the other two Conference Champions will play in the other.

Conference Brackets
Central Conference

Eastern Conference

Western Conference

W-League Championship Bracket

Divisional Round

Conference semifinals

Conference finals

W-League Semifinals

W-League Third-Place Game

W-League Final

References

2007
Women
1
W